Gleditsia sinensis, known as zào jiá (皂荚) or Chinese honey locust and black locust in English, is a species of flowering plant native to Asia.

Description
Zao jia grows as a tree up to 30 m tall. Spines are often branching and are robust, terete, conical and up to 16 cm in length. Leaves are pinnate. Flowers are yellowish-white and polygamous with male flowers being 9-10 mm in diameter and bisexual flowers being 10-12 mm in diameter with slightly longer petals and sepals. Flowers have 4 petals and 4 sepals.

Etymology
In China, Gleditsia sinensis is commonly known as zào jiá. The English equivalents include Chinese honey locust (or Chinese honeylocust), soap bean and soap pod.

Taxonomy
Zao jia is one of 14 species in the Gleditsia genus in the Caesalpinioideae subfamily of the legume family. Of these, Gleditsia caspica is the closest phylogenetic relative of G. sinensis.

Traditional medicine
It is one of the "50 fundamental herbs" used in traditional Chinese medicine. Gleditsia sinensis has been used in China for at least 2000 years as a detergent.  The thorns of Gleditsia sinensis are used as a medicinal herb in China and Korea and may have antitumor properties.  The thorns of Gleditsia sinensis LAM. (Leguminosae) have been used in traditional medicine for the treatment of inflammatory diseases including swelling, suppuration, carbuncle and skin diseases.

References

sinensis
Plants used in traditional Chinese medicine